J. V. Haden (full name and dates of birth and death unknown) was an English cricketer.  Haden's batting style is also unknown.

Haden made his first-class debut for Surrey against Nottinghamshire in 1882.  He made six further first-class appearances in that season, the last of which came against Lancashire.  In his seven first-class matches, he scored 42 runs at a batting average of 4.20, with a high score of 22.

References

External links
J. V. Haden at ESPNcricinfo
J. V. Haden at CricketArchive

English cricketers
Surrey cricketers